"Oh What a Love" is a song written by Jimmy Ibbotson, and recorded by American country music group Nitty Gritty Dirt Band. It was released in November 1987 as the third single from the album Hold On.  They reached number 5 on the Billboard Hot Country Singles & Tracks chart. The b-side of this single is America, My Sweetheart (George Green / Rick Giles). The label says "B Side not available on any album".

Charts

Weekly charts

Year-end charts

References

1988 singles
1987 songs
Nitty Gritty Dirt Band songs
Song recordings produced by Paul Worley
Warner Records singles
Songs written by Jimmy Ibbotson